Gianluigi Bianco (born 11 May 1989) is an Italian footballer who plays as a defender.

Club career
Born in Genoa, Liguria, Bianco started his career at hometown club Sampdoria. On 13 August 2008, he left for Serie B side Empoli in co-ownership deal for €900,000 in a four-year deal.

In June 2009, he was bought back by Sampdoria for €500,000 in a four-year deal. In July 2009, he was loaned to Serie B side Sassuolo along with Jonathan Rossini. After playing five games for Sampdoria in the 2010 pre-season, he rejoined Sassuolo on loan. In January 2011 he left for Serie B bottom club Frosinone.

On 31 August 2012 Bianco left for Avellino for free.

On 10 July 2014 he was signed by Casertana.

International career
Bianco was capped for the Italy U17 team on 1 June 2007, against Juniores Best XI, in an unofficial friendly.

He was also called up to the Italy U19 team, for 2008 UEFA European Under-19 Football Championship elite qualification, but did not play.

Bianco was capped once for Italy U20 team at 2008–09 Four Nations Tournament. He also played once for Italy under-21 Serie B representative team, in an internal training match. In February 2010, he received his first U21 call-up, for the 2011 U21 Euro qualifying match against Hungary U21 on 3 March. Bianco appeared as unused bench on that match.

References

External links
 
 FIGC National Team data 
 Profile at Football.it 
 

Italian footballers
Italy youth international footballers
Serie B players
U.C. Sampdoria players
Empoli F.C. players
U.S. Sassuolo Calcio players
Frosinone Calcio players
L.R. Vicenza players
U.S. Avellino 1912 players
F.C. Grosseto S.S.D. players
Benevento Calcio players
U.S. Cremonese players
Association football defenders
Footballers from Genoa
1989 births
Living people